Soil loss tolerance for a specific soil, also known as the T value, is the maximum average annual soil loss expressed as tons per acre per year that will permit current production levels to be maintained economically and indefinitely.  T values range from 1 to 5 tons per acre per year.  According to the United States Department of Agriculture's National Resource Conservation Service, in 2007 in the US, 99 million acres (28% of all cropland) were eroding above soil loss tolerance (T) rates.  This was compared to 169 million acres (40% of cropland) in 1982.

History

In the United States
The idea of soil loss tolerance was initially devised by the SCS (known presently as the NRCS). It was based on the minimum soil loss rate required to reduce organic content and harm crop productivity. In its early stages of development, soil loss tolerance rates were inconsistent because they were obtained based on rough estimates. From 1961 to 1962, several groups of soil in the United States were designated with T rates ranging from 2 to 6 tons per acre per year. The rate was subsequently adjusted to 1 to 5 tons per acre per year. The value was adapted for use in conservation management beginning in the mid-1960s.

References 

Soil